Emiel "Milo" Sarens, sometimes written as Émile Saerens (1 July 1937 – 18 June 2020) was a Belgian boxer. Sarens competed in the men's middleweight event at the 1960 Summer Olympics, where he lost in the first round.

Sarens's career highlight came in a losing effort against Sugar Ray Robinson at Sportpaleis, Antwerp in 1963. Robinson was one of the best boxers at that time, yet needed eight rounds to win with a knock-out.

1960 Olympic results
Below is the record of Milo Sarens, a Belgian middleweight boxer who competed at the 1960 Rome Olympics:

 Round of 32: bye
 Round of 16: lost to Chang Lo-pu (Formosa) by decision, 1-4

References

External links
 

1937 births
2020 deaths
Belgian male boxers
Olympic boxers of Belgium
Boxers at the 1960 Summer Olympics
Sportspeople from Mechelen
Middleweight boxers